The West Virginia State Treasurer is the state's chief financial officer. It is one of six constitutionally mandated offices. Elected statewide for a four year term, the treasurer is responsible for overseeing state operating funds, monitoring state debt and performing banking and accounting duties in accordance with state law. The state treasurer also serves on several state government financial boards.

Qualifications
In accordance with the West Virginia State Constitution, qualifications for state treasurer include being a citizen of West Virginia who is entitled to vote, and who has been a resident of West Virginia for at least the preceding five years. There are no limits on the number of terms the state treasurer can serve.

In the event of a vacancy, the governor is authorized to appoint a treasurer until a special election can be held for the remainder of the term. In making the appointment, the governor is required to choose from a list of three nominees submitted by the executive committee of the state party to which the previous treasurer belonged. If the nominees are not submitted within 15 days, the governor is empowered to appoint within five days a qualified nominee of the previous treasurer's party.

History and functions
The state treasurer's office was created at the 1863 Constitutional Convention that founded the state of West Virginia. The functions of the state treasurer's office are detailed in various sections of the West Virginia Code.

The state treasurer is the state's chief financial officer and has responsibility for the cash management of West Virginia’s government. Duties include:

Receiving and disbursing state funds
Filing and retaining paid checks and state bonds
Collecting crime victim's compensation, law enforcement training, regional jail authority and litter control fund fees
Disbursing coal, oil and gas severance taxes, liquor taxes, wine taxes and the fire and casualty insurance premium tax to local governments
Issuing quarterly and annual reports state debt reports
Providing safekeeping
Other banking and accounting functions related to state finances

Another role of the state treasurer is membership on several state government financial boards. The treasurer serves as chair of the Board of Treasury Investments and Prepaid Tuition and Savings Program Board of Trustees. In addition, the treasurer serves on the:

Agricultural Land Protection Authorities Board of Trustees
Board of Public Works
Board of the School Fund
Consolidated Public Retirement Board
Council of Finance and Administration
Enterprise Resource Planning Board
Higher Education Student Financial Aid Advisory Board
Hospital Finance Authority
Housing Development Fund Board of Directors
Investment Management Board
Lending and Credit Rate Board
Municipal Bond Commission
Purchasing Card Advisory Committee
Special Reclamation Fund Advisory Council
Tobacco Settlement Finance Authority

List of West Virginia State Treasurers
Individuals who have served as West Virginia State Treasurer include:

1863-1866 – Campbell Tarr (R-Brooke)
1866-1868 – Jacob H. Brister (R-Taylor)
1868-1870 – James A. MaCauley (R-Ohio)
1870-1876 – John S. Burdette (D-Taylor)
1876-1876 – Sobieski Brady (D-Ohio)
1876-1880 – Thomas J. West (D-Harrison)
1880-1884 – Thomas O'Brien (D-Ohio)
1884-1892 – William T. Thompson (D-Cabell)
1892-1896 – John M. Rowan (D-Monroe)
1896-1900 – M. A. Kendall (R-Wood)
1900-1904 – Peter Silman (R-Kanawha)
1904-1908 – Newton Ogden (R-Pleasants)
1908-1916 – E. Leslie Long (R-McDowell)
1916-1932 – W. S. Johnson (R-Fayette)
1932-1950 – Richard E. Talbott (D-Barbour)
1950-1956 – William H. Ansel Jr. (D-Hampshire)
1956-1960 – Orel J. Skeen (D-Jackson)
1960-1975 – John H. Kelly (D-Kanawha)
1975-1976 – Ronald G. Pearson (R-Marion)
1976-1984 – Larrie Bailey (D-Marion)
1984-1989 – A. James Manchin (D-Marion)
1989-1990 – Thomas E. Loehr (D-Wetzel)
1990-1996 – Larrie Bailey (D-Marion)
1996-2021 – John D. Perdue (D-Kanawha)
2021- Present – Riley Moore (R-Jefferson)

References

State treasurers of West Virginia